Qabiao, Pu Peo or sometimes Laqua (Chinese: Pubiao 普标, Vietnamese: Pu Péo) is a Kra language spoken by the Qabiao people in northern Vietnam and Yunnan, China. Alternative names for Qabiao include Kabeo, Ka Beo, Ka Bao, Ka Biao, Laqua, Pubiao (Pupeo or Pu Péo) and Pen Ti Lolo (Bendi Lolo). The meaning of the name "Qabiao" is unknown.

Maza, a Lolo–Burmese language spoken near the Qabiao area, is notable for having a Qabiao substratum (Hsiu 2014:68-69).

Geographic distribution
In Vietnam, Qabiao is spoken in Đồng Văn District, Hà Giang Province in Phố Là and Sủng Chéng villages, and perhaps also in Yên Minh and Mèo Vạc Districts.

Tran (2011:15) reports that Qabiao is spoken in the following locations of Ha Giang Province.
Phố Là, Sùng Chéng, Phó Bảng, Phó Cáo, and Má Lé communes of Đồng Văn District
Cháng Lổ and Sùng Chéng of Phú Lũng commune, Yên Minh District
Tiến Xuân, Yen Cường commune, Bắc Mê District
Mèo Vạc District

The Pu Péo (Qabiao) of Vietnam claim that they had traditionally lived in the following villages in Vietnam and China (Tran 2011:16).
Đồng Văn District, Vietnam
Phó Bảng (Mó Biêng)
Phó Cáo (Mó Cao)
Phó Là (Mó Nê)
Phó Lủng (Mó Căn)
Malipo County, China
Phú Trú (Mó Nương)
Phú Trác (Mó Căn)
Phú Pliông (Mó Phuông)
Phú Trao (Mó Rào)

In China, Qabiao is spoken in Tiechang Township 铁厂镇 and Donggan Township 懂干镇 in Malipo County, Wenshan Zhuang and Miao Autonomous Prefecture, Yunnan (Liang, et al. 2007). Many Qabiao people have shifted to Southwestern Mandarin, although it is still spoken in villages such as Pufeng 普峰.

Phonology
The Qabiao language has the following tones: A1, A2, B1, B2, C1, C2, D1, D2.

Like Paha (J.-F. Li and Y.-X. Luo 2010: 16–17), Long-haired Lachi (Kosaka 2000: 20–24) and Buyang, Qabiao (J.-R. Zhang 1990) have sesquisyllables, which are not present in most Kra-Dai languages.

Notes

References

Hsiu, Andrew. 2014. "Mondzish: a new subgroup of Lolo-Burmese". In Proceedings of the 14th International Symposium on Chinese Languages and Linguistics (IsCLL-14). Taipei: Academia Sinica.
Liang Min, Zhang Junru & Li Yunbing (2007). Pubiao yu yanjiu. Beijing: The Ethnic Publishing House.

Further reading
Nguyen, Thu Quynh. 2019. Characteristics of Pu Peo: A language at risk of endangerment. Presentation at the Conference on Asian Linguistic Anthropology, the CALA 2019, Paññāsāstra University of Cambodia.
Trần, Văn Ái. 2011. Văn hóa dân gian của dân tộc Pu Péo ở Việt Nam. Hanoi: Nhà xuất bản văn hóa thông tin. 
Various. 2012. Dân ca các dân tộc Pu Péo, Sán Dìu, Dao, Lô Lô, Cao Lan. Hanoi: Nhà xuất bản văn hóa dân tộc.

External links
 ABVD: Qabiao word list
https://web.archive.org/web/20131202230837/http://cema.gov.vn/modules.php?name=Content&op=details&mid=526

Kra languages
Languages of China
Languages of Vietnam